Pontoppidania is a genus of mites in the family Acaridae.

Species
 Pontoppidania littoralis (Halbert, 1920)

References

Acaridae